

Adams County
Adams-Friendship High School, Adams

Ashland County
Ashland High School, Ashland
Butternut High School, Butternut
Glidden High School, Glidden
Mellen High School, Mellen

Barron County
Barron High School, Barron
Cameron High School, Cameron
Chetek-Weyerhaeuser High School, Chetek
Cumberland High School, Cumberland
Prairie Farm High School, Prairie Farm
Rice Lake High School, Rice Lake
Turtle Lake High School, Turtle Lake

Bayfield County
Bayfield High School, Bayfield
Drummond High School, Drummond
South Shore High School, Port Wing
Washburn High School, Washburn

Brown County
Ashwaubenon High School, Green Bay
Bay City Baptist School, Green Bay
Bay Port High School, Green Bay
De Pere High School, De Pere
 Denmark High School, Denmark
Green Bay East High School, Green Bay
Green Bay Southwest High School, Green Bay
Green Bay West High School, Green Bay
Northeastern Wisconsin Lutheran High School, Green Bay
Notre Dame De La Baie Academy, Green Bay
Preble High School, Green Bay
Pulaski High School, Pulaski
West De Pere High School, De Pere
Wrightstown High School, Wrightstown

Buffalo County
Alma High School, Alma
Cochrane-Fountain City High School, Fountain City
Gilmanton High School, Gilmanton
Mondovi High School, Mondovi

Burnett County
Grantsburg High School, Grantsburg
Siren High School, Siren
Webster High School, Webster

Calumet County
Brillion High School, Brillion
Chilton High School, Chilton
Hilbert High School, Hilbert
New Holstein High School, New Holstein
Stockbridge High School, Stockbridge

Chippewa County
Bloomer High School, Bloomer
Cadott High School, Cadott
Chippewa Falls High School, Chippewa Falls
Cornell High School, Cornell
Holcombe High School, Holcombe
McDonell Central Catholic High School, Chippewa Falls
New Auburn High School, New Auburn
Stanley-Boyd High School, Stanley

Clark County
Abbotsford High School, Abbotsford
Colby High School, Colby
Granton High School, Granton
Greenwood High School, Greenwood
Loyal High School, Loyal
Neillsville High School, Neillsville
Owen-Withee High School, Owen
Thorp High School, Thorp

Columbia County
Cambria-Friesland High School, Cambria
Columbus Senior High School, Columbus
Fall River High School, Fall River
Lodi High School, Lodi
Pardeeville High School, Pardeeville
Portage High School, Portage
Poynette High School, Poynette
Rio High School, Rio
Wisconsin Academy, Columbus
Wisconsin Dells High School, Wisconsin Dells

Crawford County
North Crawford High School, Soldiers Grove
Prairie du Chien High School, Prairie du Chien
Seneca High School, Seneca
Wauzeka High School, Wauzeka

Dane County
Abundant Life Christian School, Madison
Belleville High School, Belleville
Capital High School, Madison
DeForest High School, DeForest
Deerfield High School, Deerfield
La Follette High School, Madison
Madison Country Day School, Madison
Madison East High School, Madison
Madison West High School, Madison
Marshall High School, Marshall
McFarland High School, McFarland
Middleton High School, Middleton
Monona Grove High School, Monona
Mount Horeb High School, Mount Horeb
Oregon High School, Oregon
Malcolm Shabazz City High School, Madison
St. Ambrose Academy, Madison
Stoughton High School, Stoughton
Sun Prairie East High School, Sun Prairie
Sun Prairie West High School, Sun Prairie
Vel Phillips Memorial High School, Madison
Verona Area High School, Verona
Waunakee High School, Waunakee
Wisconsin Heights High School, Mazomanie

Dodge County
Beaver Dam High School, Beaver Dam

Horicon High School, Horicon
Hustisford High School, Hustisford
Lomira High School, Lomira
Maranatha Baptist Academy High School, Watertown 
Mayville High School, Mayville
Randolph High School, Randolph
Watertown High School, Watertown
Wayland Academy, Beaver Dam
Waupun High School, Waupun
Central Wisconsin Christian High School, Waupun

Door County
Gibraltar High School, Fish Creek
Sevastopol High School, Sturgeon Bay
Southern Door High School, Brussels
Sturgeon Bay High School, Sturgeon Bay
Washington Island High School, Washington Island

Douglas County
Northwestern High School, Maple
Solon Springs High School, Solon Springs
Superior High School, Superior

Dunn County
Boyceville High School, Boyceville
Colfax High School, Colfax
Elk Mound High School, Elk Mound
Lucas Charter School, Menomonie
Menomonie High School, Menomonie

Eau Claire County
Altoona High School, Altoona
Augusta High School, Augusta
Eau Claire Christian High School, Eau Claire
Memorial High School, Eau Claire
North High School, Eau Claire
Eau Claire Technology Charter School, Eau Claire
Fall Creek High School, Fall Creek
Immanuel Lutheran High School, Eau Claire
McKinley Charter School, Eau Claire
Regis High School, Eau Claire

Florence County
Florence High School, Florence

Fond du Lac County
Campbellsport High School, Campbellsport
Fond du Lac High School, Fond du Lac
Laconia High School, Rosendale
Horace Mann High School, North Fond du Lac
Oakfield High School, Oakfield
Ripon High School, Ripon
St. Lawrence Seminary High School, Mount Calvary
St. Mary Springs High School, Fond du Lac
Winnebago Lutheran Academy, Fond du Lac

Forest County
Crandon High School, Crandon
Laona High School, Laona
Wabeno High School, Wabeno

Grant County
Boscobel High School, Boscobel
Cassville High School, Cassville
Cuba City High School, Cuba City
Fennimore High School, Fennimore
Lancaster High School, Lancaster
Platteville High School, Platteville
Potosi High School, Potosi
River Ridge High School, Patch Grove
Riverdale High School, Muscoda
Southwestern Wisconsin High School, Hazel Green

Green County
Albany High School, Albany
Brodhead High School, Brodhead
Juda High School, Juda
Monroe High School, Monroe
Monticello High School, Monticello
New Glarus High School, New Glarus

Green Lake County
Berlin High School, Berlin
Green Lake High School, Green Lake
Markesan High School, Markesan
Princeton High School, Princeton

Iowa County
Barneveld High School, Barneveld
Dodgeville High School, Dodgeville
Highland High School, Highland
Iowa-Grant High School, Livingston
Mineral Point High School, Mineral Point

Iron County
Hurley K-12 School, Hurley
Mercer High School, Mercer

Jackson County
Black River Falls High School, Black River Falls
Lincoln High School, Alma Center
Melrose-Mindoro High School, Melrose

Jefferson County
Cambridge High School, Cambridge
Fort Atkinson High School, Fort Atkinson
Jefferson High School, Jefferson
Johnson Creek High School, Johnson Creek
Lake Mills High School, Lake Mills
Lakeside Lutheran High School, Lake Mills
Luther Preparatory School, Watertown (formerly Northwestern Preparatory School)
Maranatha Baptist Academy, Watertown
Palmyra-Eagle High School, Palmyra
Waterloo High School, Waterloo

Juneau County
Mauston High School, Mauston
Necedah High School, Necedah
New Lisbon High School, New Lisbon
Royall High School, Elroy
Wonewoc-Center High School, Wonewoc

Kenosha County
Mary D. Bradford High School, Kenosha
Christian Life High School, Kenosha
Indian Trail Academy, Kenosha
Harborside Academy, Kenosha
Hillcrest School, Kenosha
Lakeview Tech Academy, Pleasant Prairie
Walter Reuther Central High School, Kenosha
St. Joseph High School, Kenosha
Shoreland Lutheran High School, Somers
George Nelson Tremper High School, Kenosha
Westosha Central High School, Salem
Wilmot Union High School, Wilmot

Kewaunee County
Algoma High School, Algoma
Kewaunee High School, Kewaunee
Luxemburg-Casco High School, Luxemburg

La Crosse County
Aquinas High School, La Crosse
Bangor High School, Bangor
Coulee Region Christian School, West Salem
Holmen High School, Holmen
LaCrossroads Charter School, La Crosse
La Crosse Central High School, La Crosse
Logan High School, La Crosse
Luther High School, Onalaska
Onalaska High School, Onalaska
Providence Academy, La Crosse
West Salem High School, West Salem

Lafayette County
Argyle High School, Argyle
Belmont High School, Belmont
Benton High School, Benton
Black Hawk High School, South Wayne
Darlington High School, Darlington
Pecatonica High School, Blanchardville
Shullsburg High School, Shullsburg

Langlade County
Antigo High School, Antigo
Elcho High School, Elcho
White Lake High School, White Lake

Lincoln County
Lincoln Hills School, Irma
Merrill High School, Merrill
Tomahawk High School, Tomahawk
New Testament Church Christian Academy, Merrill

Manitowoc County
Kiel High School, Kiel
Lincoln High School, Manitowoc
Manitowoc Lutheran High School, Manitowoc
Mishicot High School, Mishicot
Reedsville High School, Reedsville
Roncalli High School, Manitowoc
Two Rivers High School, Two Rivers
Valders High School, Valders

Marathon County
Athens High School, Athens
Edgar High School, Edgar
D.C. Everest High School, Weston
Faith Christian Academy, Wausau
Marathon High School, Marathon
Mosinee High School, Mosinee
Newman Catholic High School, Wausau
Northland Lutheran High School, Kronenwetter
Spencer High School, Spencer
Stratford High School, Stratford
Wausau East High School, Wausau
Wausau Engineering and Global Leadership (EGL) Academy, Wausau
Wausau West High School, Wausau
Wisconsin Valley Lutheran High School, Mosinee

Marinette County
Coleman High School, Coleman
Crivitz High School, Crivitz
Goodman High School, Goodman
Catholic Central High School, Marinette
Marinette High School, Marinette
Niagara High School, Niagara
Pembine High School, Pembine
Peshtigo High School, Peshtigo
Wausaukee High School, Wausaukee
Pioneer Christian School, Beecher

Marquette County
Montello High School, Montello
Westfield Area High School, Westfield

Menominee County
Menominee Indian High School, Keshena

Milwaukee County

City of Milwaukee
Afro Urban Institute, Milwaukee
Alliance High School, Milwaukee
Assata School, Milwaukee
Bay View High School, Milwaukee
Believers in Christ Academy High School
Bradley Technology & Trade High School, Milwaukee
Cornerstone Achievement Academy, Milwaukee
Custer High School, Milwaukee
Destiny High School, Milwaukee
Divine Savior Holy Angels High School, Milwaukee
Eastbrook Academy, Milwaukee
El Puente High School, Milwaukee
Hamilton High School, Milwaukee
HR Academy, Milwaukee
Juneau High School, Milwaukee
Learning Enterprise of Wisconsin School, Milwaukee
Loyola Academy, Milwaukee
Madison High School, Milwaukee
Marquette University High School, Milwaukee
Marshall High School, Milwaukee
Messmer High School, Milwaukee
Metropolitan High School, Milwaukee
Milwaukee High School of the Arts, Milwaukee
Milwaukee Lutheran High School, Milwaukee
Milwaukee School of Entrepreneurship, Milwaukee
Milwaukee Spectrum School, Milwaukee
New School for Community Service, Milwaukee
North Division High School, Milwaukee
Nova School, Milwaukee
Pius XI High School, Milwaukee
Phoenix School, Milwaukee
Pulaski High School, Milwaukee
Ronald Wilson Reagan College Preparatory High School, City of Milwaukee
Riverside University High School, Milwaukee
Rufus King High School, Milwaukee
St. Anthony High School, Milwaukee
St. Joan Antida High School, Milwaukee
Shalom High School, Milwaukee
South Division High School, Milwaukee
Spotted Eagle High School, Milwaukee
Tenor High School, Milwaukee
Veritas High School, Milwaukee
Vincent High School, Milwaukee
Washington High School, Milwaukee
Aurora Weier Educational Center, Milwaukee
Wisconsin Institute for Torah Study, Milwaukee
Pius Xi Catholic High School, Milwaukee 
Wisconsin Lutheran High School, Milwaukee

Suburban
Brown Deer High School, Brown Deer
Cudahy High School, Cudahy
Dominican High School, Whitefish Bay
Franklin High School, Franklin
Greendale High School, Greendale
Greenfield High School, Greenfield
Heritage Christian School, West Allis
Kradwell School, Wauwatosa
Martin Luther High School, Greendale
Nathan Hale High School, West Allis
Nicolet High School, Glendale
Oak Creek High School, Oak Creek
Saint Francis High School, Saint Francis
Saint Thomas More High School, St. Francis
Shorewood High School, Shorewood
South Milwaukee High School, South Milwaukee
Torah Academy of Milwaukee (TAM), Glendale
University School of Milwaukee, River Hills
Wauwatosa East High School, Wauwatosa
Wauwatosa West High School, Wauwatosa
West Allis Central High School, West Allis
Whitefish Bay High School, Whitefish Bay
Whitnall High School, Greenfield

Monroe County
Cashton High School, Cashton
Sparta High School, Sparta
High Point Charter School, Sparta
Tomah High School, Tomah, (actually named Ronald Reagan High School, but is commonly referred to as Tomah)

Oconto County
Gillett High School, Gillett
Lena High School, Lena
Oconto Falls High School, Oconto Falls
Oconto High School, Oconto
Suring High School, Suring

Oneida County
Lakeland Union High School, Minocqua
Rhinelander High School, Rhinelander
Three Lakes High School, Three Lakes

Outagamie County
Appleton East High School, Appleton
Appleton North High School, Appleton
Appleton West High School, Appleton
Fox Valley Lutheran High School, Appleton
Freedom High School, Freedom
Hortonville High School, Hortonville
Kaukauna High School, Kaukauna
Kimberly High School, Kimberly
Little Chute High School, Little Chute
Seymour Community High School, Seymour
Shiocton High School, Shiocton
Xavier High School, Appleton

Ozaukee County
Cedarburg High School, Cedarburg
Grafton High School, Grafton
Homestead High School, Mequon
Ozaukee High School, Fredonia
Port Washington High School, Port Washington

Pepin County
Durand High School, Durand
Pepin High School, Pepin

Pierce County
Ellsworth High School, Ellsworth
Elmwood High School, Elmwood
Plum City High School, Plum City
Prescott High School, Prescott
River Falls High School, River Falls
Spring Valley High School, Spring Valley

Polk County
Amery High School, Amery
Clayton High School, Clayton
Clear Lake High School, Clear Lake
Frederic High School, Frederic
Luck High School, Luck
Osceola High School, Osceola
Saint Croix Falls High School, Saint Croix Falls
Unity High School, Balsam Lake

Portage County
Almond-Bancroft High School, Almond
Amherst High School, Amherst
Rosholt High School, Rosholt
Pacelli High School, Stevens Point
Stevens Point Area Senior High (SPASH), Stevens Point

Price County
Park Falls High School, Park Falls
Phillips High School, Phillips
Prentice High School, Prentice

Racine County
Burlington High School, Burlington
Jerome I. Case High School, Racine
Burlington Catholic Central High School, Burlington
William Horlick High School, Racine
Racine Lutheran High School, Racine
The Prairie School, Wind Point
St. Catherine's High School, Racine
Union Grove High School, Union Grove
Walden III Middle/High School, Racine
Washington Park High School, Racine
Waterford Union High School, Waterford
W. Brimley High School, Waterford

Richland County
Ithaca High School, Richland Center
Richland Center High School, Richland Center
Eagle High School, Richland Center

Rock County
Beloit Memorial High School, Beloit
Clinton High School, Clinton
Joseph A. Craig High School, Janesville
Edgerton High School, Edgerton
Evansville High School, Evansville
Milton High School, Milton
Oakhill Christian School, Janesville
George S. Parker High School, Janesville
Parkview High School, Orfordville
Rock River Charter School, Janesville
Turner High School, Town of Beloit

Rusk County
Bruce High School, Bruce
Flambeau High School, Tony
Ladysmith High School, Ladysmith

St. Croix County
Baldwin-Woodville High School, Baldwin
Glenwood City High School, Glenwood City
Hudson High School, Hudson 
New Richmond High School, New Richmond
Saint Croix Central High School, Hammond
Somerset High School, Somerset

Sauk County
Baraboo High School, Baraboo
Community Christian School, Baraboo
Reedsburg Area High School, Reedsburg
River Valley High School, Spring Green
Sauk Prairie High School, Prairie du Sac
Weston High School, Cazenovia

Sawyer County
Hayward High School, Hayward
Lac Courte Oreilles Ojibwe High School, Hayward
Winter High School, Winter

Shawano County
Bonduel High School, Bonduel
Bowler High School, Bowler
Gresham High School, Gresham
Shawano High School, Shawano
Tigerton High School, Tigerton
Wittenberg-Birnamwood High School, Wittenberg
Wolf River Lutheran High School, Shawano

Sheboygan County
Cedar Grove-Belgium High School, Cedar Grove
Elkhart Lake-Glenbeulah High School, Elkhart Lake
Howards Grove High School, Howards Grove
Kohler High School, Kohler
Oostburg High School, Oostburg
Plymouth High School, Plymouth
Random Lake High School, Random Lake
Sheboygan County Christian High School, Sheboygan
Sheboygan Falls High School, Sheboygan Falls
Sheboygan Area Lutheran High School, Sheboygan
Sheboygan North High School, Sheboygan
Sheboygan South High School, Sheboygan

Taylor County
Gilman High School, Gilman
Medford High School, Medford
Rib Lake High School, Rib Lake

Trempealeau County
Arcadia High School, Arcadia
Blair-Taylor High School, Blair
Gale-Ettrick-Trempealeau High School, Galesville
Independence High School, Independence
Osseo-Fairchild High School, Osseo
Whitehall High School, Whitehall
Eleva-Strum High School, Strum

Vernon County
Better Futures High School, Viroqua
Brookwood High School, Ontario
Cornerstone Christian Academy, Viroqua
De Soto High School, De Soto
Hillsboro High School, Hillsboro
Kickapoo High School, Viola
La Farge High School, La Farge
Laurel High School, Viroqua
Viroqua High School, Viroqua
Westby Area High School, Westby
Youth Initiative High School, Viroqua

Vilas County
Conserve School, Land O' Lakes
Northland Pines High School, Eagle River
Phelps High School, Phelps

Walworth County
Badger High School, Lake Geneva
Big Foot High School, Walworth
Delavan-Darien High School, Delavan
Divine Word Seminary High School, East Troy
East Troy High School, East Troy
Elkhorn Area High School, Elkhorn
Faith Christian High School, Williams Bay
Whitewater High School, Whitewater
Wisconsin School for the Deaf, Delavan
Williams Bay High School, Williams Bay

Washburn County
Birchwood High School, Birchwood
Shell Lake High School, Shell Lake
Spooner High School, Spooner
Northwoods High School, Minong

Washington County
Germantown High School, Germantown
Hartford Union High School, Hartford
Kettle Moraine Lutheran High School, Jackson
Kewaskum High School, Kewaskum
Living Word Lutheran High School, Jackson
Slinger High School, Slinger
West Bend East High School, West Bend
West Bend West High School, West Bend

Waukesha County
Arrowhead High School, Hartland
Brookfield Academy, Brookfield
Brookfield Central High School, Brookfield
Brookfield East High School, Brookfield
Catholic Memorial High School, Waukesha
Ethan Allen School, Wales
Hamilton High School, Sussex
Kettle Moraine High School, Wales
Lake Country Lutheran High School, Oconomowoc
Menomonee Falls High School, Menomonee Falls
Mukwonago High School, Mukwonago
Muskego High School, Muskego
New Berlin Eisenhower Middle/High School, New Berlin
New Berlin West High School, New Berlin
Norris High School, Mukwonago
Oconomowoc High School, Oconomowoc
Pewaukee High School, Pewaukee
Harvey Philip Alternative Charter School, Waukesha
St. John's Northwestern Military Academy, Delafield
University Lake School, Hartland
Waukesha Christian Academy, Waukesha
Waukesha North High School, Waukesha
Waukesha South High School, Waukesha
Waukesha West High School, Waukesha

Waupaca County
Clintonville High School, Clintonville
Iola-Scandinavia High School, Iola
Little Wolf High School, Manawa
Marion High School, Marion
New London High School, New London
Starr Academy, New London
Waupaca High School, Waupaca
Weyauwega-Fremont High School, Weyauwega

Waushara County
Tri-County High School (Wisconsin), Plainfield
Wautoma High School, Wautoma
Wild Rose High School, Wild Rose

Winnebago County
Lourdes High School, Oshkosh
Menasha High School, Menasha
Neenah High School, Neenah
Omro High School, Omro
Oshkosh North High School, Oshkosh
Oshkosh West High School, Oshkosh
St. Mary Central High School, Neenah
Winneconne High School, Winneconne

Wood County
Assumption High School, Wisconsin Rapids
Auburndale High School, Auburndale
Columbus Catholic High School, Marshfield
John Edwards High School, Port Edwards
Lincoln High School, Wisconsin Rapids
Marshfield High School, Marshfield
Nekoosa High School, Nekoosa
Pittsville High School, Pittsville
River Cities High School, Wisconsin Rapids

See also
List of school districts in Wisconsin
List of high school athletic conferences in Wisconsin

External links
Student & School Data from Wisconsin Department of Public Instruction

Wisconsin
High schools